Yash Arora (born 17 July 1993) is an Indian cricketer. He made his List A debut on 1 April 2021, for Galle Cricket Club in the 2020–21 Major Clubs Limited Over Tournament in Sri Lanka.

References

External links
 

1993 births
Living people
Indian cricketers
Galle Cricket Club cricketers